Mycogelidiaceae is a fungal family in the order Atractiellales. The family contains the single genus Mycogelidium, which in turn contains the single species Mycogelidium sinense, found in China.

References

External links
 

Atractiellales
Fungi of Asia
Monotypic Basidiomycota genera